Machiavelli is an Italian card game derived from Rummy and is usually played by 2 up to 5 players, but can be played by even a higher number. Because of its characteristics, it is not generally associated with gambling, but is instead a party game.

Its appearance can be traced to World War II.

Dealing
Play requires two decks of 52 standard playing cards, excluding the jokers.

The dealer, chosen at random, deals 15 cards to each player in clockwise direction. If there are more than five players, the dealer may reduce the number of cards dealt to each person, three cards being the minimum. After dealing the remaining deck is placed in the center of the table.

Alternative version
Two decks of cards without jokers are needed. The dealer, chosen at random, deals 6 cards to each player in clockwise direction. After dealing he puts four face up cards in front of where he would put the rest of the cards, in the center of the table. These cards can be placed in hand only if you can form with other cards at least three of same and different numbers. They are helping cards.

Opening play
The player to the left of the dealer goes first. The game continues going clockwise.

Rules
There are three main actions that the player can decide to play:

 Play a valid combination of cards on the table.
 Add one or more cards to an existing combination of cards.
 Draw a card from the deck if you don't play any cards.

A valid combination means:

 Three (or four) of the same card, but different suits
 A straight of at least three consecutive cards of the same suit

When finished, the current player passes the game to the player on his left, and should not draw a card. A player who fails to place any cards on the table must draw the top card from the deck and end his turn.

The player who manages to play all the cards in his hand wins the game.

Special features
The defining feature of Machiavelli is being able to make changes to the combinations of cards already on the table. The current player, if desired, may reorganize the cards in order to make new combos that make it easier to play one or more cards in his hand. All new combinations must be valid, and players cannot remove any cards already on the table.

Example 1
Imagine that there are three triplets on the table: one of Kings (K), one of Queens (Q) and one of Jacks (J) consisting only of hearts, diamonds and clubs.

The current player wants to play his  on the table. He can change the combinations on the table to form three straights: one of hearts, one of diamonds and one of clubs.

Now, the player can add his  the straight made of clubs

This play is correct because all the new combinations created are valid.

Example 2
Imagine that the following combos are on the table

The current player wants to play his . He attempts to modify the groups by creating a straight of Hearts, one of Diamonds and one of Spades.

This play is not valid as it leaves a  that can not be combined with any other combination on the table. He must restore the combinations to the way they were.

The player, however, can use the last card to create a new combination with the cards in his hand. The result would be:

This final result is valid.

If a player rearranges the cards on the table, then realizes his intended play will leave invalid combinations, he must return all cards to the groups they were in before he began his turn. If he is unable to do so, he must draw three cards. The other players will then try to restore the cards to their proper groups. Any invalid cards left on the table will be later incorporated into valid groups by other players.

See also
Rummikub

References

Card games introduced in the 1940s
Italian card games